Hennie du Plessis (born 14 October 1996) is a South African professional golfer who currently plays on the European Tour and the Sunshine Tour. He also played in the inaugural LIV Golf Invitational Series.

Professional career
Du Plessis turned professional in 2015 and joined the Sunshine Tour after finishing number one at Q-School. In 2016 he recorded five top-5 finishes, including a tie for second at Vodacom Origins of Golf at Wild Coast Sun, behind Madalitso Muthiya. On the 2017–18 Sunshine Tour he won the Vodacom Origins of Golf at Sishen, clinching his maiden Sunshine Tour title on his 21st birthday. In March he won the Steyn City Team Championship with Jean Hugo.

Du Plessis tied for 6th at both of the South African Opens played in 2020, in January and December. At the 2021 installment, which lost European Tour co-sanctioning as a result of COVID-19 related travel restrictions, he finished solo 3rd, which helped him break into the top-200 on the Official World Golf Ranking for the first time.

Du Plessis played on the 2021 Challenge Tour, where he lost a four-way playoff at the Limpopo Championship to Brandon Stone. He finished 28th in the Road to Mallorca ranking. 

Playing on the 2022 European Tour, du Plessis made all but one cut in his first nine starts. He finished tied 3rd at the ISPS Handa Championship in Spain, two strokes behind winner Pablo Larrazábal, and tied for 6th at the Catalunya Championship, trailing winner Adri Arnaus by three strokes. He came close to a first European Tour victory in wire-to-wire style when he took a two-shot lead into the final round of the MyGolfLife Open in South Africa. He was part of a four-way tie after a 62 on day one and followed that with a 65 to take a one-shot lead into the weekend. A 70 in round three was enough to move him to 19 under and give him a two stroke advantage. A final day 72 saw him drop to a tie for 6th, 3 strokes shy of the three-way playoff won by Pablo Larrazábal.

Du Plessis finished runner-up at the 2022 LIV Golf Invitational London, a single stroke behind his compatriot Charl Schwartzel, to collect a  check. He also won the team event together with an all-South African team of Schwartzel, Branden Grace and Louis Oosthuizen, to collect a further $750,000.

Professional wins (4)

Sunshine Tour wins (2)

Sunshine Tour playoff record (1–2)

IGT Pro Tour wins (1)

Other wins (1)
2018 Gary Player Invitational Pro-Am (South Africa)

Playoff record
Challenge Tour playoff record (0–1)

References

External links

South African male golfers
Sunshine Tour golfers
LIV Golf players
Sportspeople from Gauteng
1996 births
Living people